The 2010–2013 Southern United States and Mexico drought was a severe to extreme drought that plagued the Southern United States, including parts of Texas, Louisiana, Arkansas, Mississippi, Alabama, Georgia, South Carolina, North Carolina, Florida, and Oklahoma; the Southwestern States, including Kansas, Colorado, New Mexico, and Arizona; as well as large parts of Mexico, in a three-year pattern from 2010 to 2013.

The worst effects were in Texas, which experienced the brunt of the drought and its driest August–July (12-month) period on record from 2010 to 2011. The dry spell in May 2011 was also said to be the worst period of drought in Texas since 1895.  The U.S. Drought Monitor reported that Lubbock, Texas has experienced the nation's worst average level of drought since the beginning of 2011. McAllen, Harlingen, Brownsville and Corpus Christi also ranked among the nine U.S. cities most affected by extreme drought. The drought in Texas caused an estimated $7.62 billion in crop and livestock losses, surpassing the previous record loss of $4.1 billion set in 2006.

History

The drought began due to a strong La Niña developing by the summer of 2010 which brings below average rainfall to the southern United States. The effects of the La Niña could be noticed immediately as much of the south receives important rainfall during the summer, and this was the driest summer for Texas and Georgia in the 21st century thus far, and much of the south received record low rainfall.

Throughout 2011, the drought was confined to the Deep South as the mid-south received flooding due to severe weather and tornadoes. However, the drought continued and intensified in the Deep South as Texas saw 2011 become its second-driest year on record, Oklahoma saw its fourth-driest, and Georgia saw its seventh-driest year on record. The winter of 2011–12 was one of the driest winters on record for the eastern and central United States. In the spring of 2012, the drought made a massive expansion from the Deep South to the Midwest, Mid-south, Great Plains, and Ohio valley. At its peak in August 2012 the drought covered approximately 81% of the United States. Throughout the winter of 2012–13, heavy rain and snow brought relief to the drought in the southern and eastern United States, even causing severe flooding. By March 2013, the eastern United States was drought-free, effectively ending the 2010–13 southern U.S. drought. Drought continued on the Great Plains until 2014. However, drought developed in the western United States in 2013 and still exists today in some areas.

Effects

The drought caused severe lack of water in the southern plains and Rocky Mountains as well as numerous wildfires, in particular the 2011 Texas wildfires, the Wallow Fire and Horseshoe 2 Fire in Arizona, the Whitewater-Baldy Complex Fire and Little Bear Fire in New Mexico, and the 2012 Colorado wildfires in Colorado. Mexico also saw serious impact from the drought which decimated crops, killed over a million cattle, and stressed local water and food supplies. The drought has been described as the worst seen in the country in 70 years.

By the end of August 2011, a ban on outdoor burning was in effect for 251 of the 254 Texas counties.  Lake levels in Texas had declined vastly, some by as much as 50 feet; E.V. Spence Reservoir was only 1% full.  This revealed various previously submerged items, ranging from a Native American's skull to a Space Shuttle Columbia tank.  On August 30, several homes in Oklahoma City were destroyed along with 1,500 wooded acres. Hundreds of homes had to be evacuated.

The drought had a detrimental effect on Texas and Oklahoma cattle ranches, who deeply culled their herds and helped cut the national cattle population to the lowest level in decades.

2012 spring rainfall improved conditions in many parts of Texas and by April 12, 2012, only 14% of the state was in "exceptional" drought, compared to 88% at the drought's peak.

In spring and summer of 2012, the drought expanded and formed the 2012 North American drought, affecting more than 80% of the contiguous United States.

In Texas 

According to the U.S. Drought Monitor, a joint effort of the National Drought Mitigation Center, the United States Department of Agriculture and the National Oceanic and Atmospheric Administration, as of late November 2012, about 4 percent of Texas remained in "extreme" or "exceptional" drought, the two most severe categories.

The drought caused billions of dollars in losses throughout the state economy. Farmers and ranchers were among those hardest hit. The Texas A&M AgriLife Extension Service estimates that Texas agricultural producers lost nearly $7.6 billion due to the drought.

Drought and unprecedented heat made 2011 the worst year for wildfires in Texas history. From Nov. 15, 2010 through Sept. 29, 2011, Texas saw 23,835 fires that burned more than 3.8 million acres and destroyed 2,763 Texas homes. Timber lost to drought and wildfire could have produced $1.6 billion worth of products, resulting in a $3.4 billion economic impact in East Texas.

See also 
2012–13 North American drought
2010 Northern Hemisphere summer
Days of Prayer for Rain in the State of Texas
2011 North American heat wave
Summer 2012 North American heat wave
2012 Colorado wildfires
2012 Oklahoma wildfires
Global warming
Desertification
La Niña

References

External links

 Drought Cripples the South: Why the 'Creeping Disaster' Could Get a Whole Lot Worse by Bryan Walsh, August 9, 2011, on Time
 Drought-fueled wildfires burn out of control in Texas by Andrew Freedman in The Washington Post September 6, 2011.
  Analysts: Southwestern US Drought Might Raise Global Food Prices by Greg Flakus September 8, 2011
 Crews battle wildfires amid severe Texas drought; 'It was unbelievable, just horrific. There were horses on fire, buildings on fire' April 12, 2011 Associated Press
 Record Texas Drought Burns Cotton Farmers as White Gold Withers by Elizabeth Campbell September 15, 2011 on Bloomberg.com
Epic scorching drought testing Texas' ways; Massive droughts caused by wildfires in Texas have ravaged the environment, incited a tug of war for available water, and fundamentally changed the way of life for the state's millions of residents. September 26, 2011 The Christian Science Monitor

Texas Drought Forces a Town to Sip From a Truck February 3, 2012 The New York Times
 Even After Rain, Texas Drought Persists February 6, 2012 The Wall Street Journal
Experts: Oklahoma, not Texas, had hottest summer ever, June 6, 2012
Action Needed Now to Prepare for Severe Drought May 22, 2012
Searing Sun and Drought Shrivel Corn in Midwest July 4, 2012
Rising Temperatures and Drought Create Fears of a New Dust Bowl July 5, 2012
Corn Prices Soar as Midwest Bakes; The Crop's Futures are Approaching Record Set in June 2011 July 9, 2012
Drought puts more than half of U.S. counties in disaster zones, USDA says - CNN.com August 1, 2012
Drought Stalks the Global Food Supply July 5, 2012  BusinessWeek
 Warming indicted for extreme weather; Climate change can explain some 2011 departures from the norm August 11, 2012; Vol.182 #3 (p. 14) Science News

2010s meteorology
Southern United States
Southern United States
Southern United States
Southern United States
Drought
Drought
Drought
Drought
Droughts in the United States
History of the Southern United States
Droughts in Mexico
Articles containing video clips